George Melvin "Jud" Heathcote (May 27, 1927 – August 28, 2017) was an American basketball player and coach. He was a college basketball head coach for 24 seasons: five at the University of Montana  and nineteen at Michigan State University  Heathcote coached Magic Johnson during his two years at Michigan State, concluding with the 1979 national championship season.  He also coached the University of Montana to a national handball championship in 1974.

Early years
Born in Harvey, North Dakota, to Marion Grant Heathcote and Fawn (Walsh), Heathcote's father was a coach, but died in a 1930 diphtheria epidemic. His mother was a teacher and moved to live with her parents in Manchester, Washington, west of Seattle.

Heathcote developed into a fine three-sport athlete at South Kitsap High School in Port Orchard, and after a year in the Navy V-5 program as  ended, he enrolled at Washington State College in Pullman and played basketball for the Cougars under head coach

Coaching career
At age 44, Montana was the first for Heathcote as head coach of a college varsity program. Out of college, he coached for fourteen seasons at West Valley High School in Spokane, Washington, then at alma mater Washington State for seven years under Marv Harshman; five as freshman coach and two as frosh-varsity coach.

Montana had little historic success in the sport, but in his fourth season at Missoula in  Heathcote led the Grizzlies to their first Big Sky Conference championship. They advanced to the NCAA Regionals, but lost by three in Portland in the Sweet Sixteen to eventual champion 

Heathcote was hired by Joseph Kearney at Michigan State in April 1976 and began the most successful phase of his coaching career. In his third season in East Lansing, he guided the Spartans to the NCAA championship. Led on the court by sophomore Magic Johnson, MSU defeated the Larry Bird-led Indiana State Sycamores in the title game in 

In his nineteen years at Michigan State, the Spartans made nine NCAA tournament appearances and three National Invitation Tournament (NIT) appearances. As a coach, Heathcote was particularly noted for his excellent defensive strategies on the court and was second to none in blocking the opposing team from penetrating to the hoop. Heathcote retired after the 1994–95 season, having won 418 games and lost 275, for a .603 winning percentage. He was succeeded by Tom Izzo, a thirteen-year assistant coach and associate head coach for Heathcote's final five seasons.

Retirement
After retiring from coaching, Heathcote returned to Spokane, where he lived until his death. He played handball until well into his seventies, and continued to play recreational golf. While Heathcote continued to follow Michigan State during the college season, his primary basketball interest in his final years was the local Gonzaga University; he attended all Bulldogs home games, and had a monthly lunch with head coach Mark Few.

On August 28, 2017, Heathcote died at the age of 90. "Michigan State has lost one of its icons today,"  current MSU basketball coach Tom Izzo said in a statement. "And yet, nothing can erase his impact on the program, the players he coached and the coaches he mentored. Spartan basketball is what it is today because of Jud Heathcote."

Head coaching record

College

*Due to forfeits related to NCAA sanctions to Minnesota for improper selling of tickets, MSU's official record for the 1976–77 season is 12–15, 9–9 though they finished the season 10–17, 7–11.^Due to NCAA sanctions against Wisconsin for providing improper benefits for players, MSU's official record for the 1981–82 season is 12–16, 7–11 though they finished the season 11–17, 6–12. The official record for the 1983–84 seasonal  is 16–12, 9–9 though they finished the season 15–13, 8–10

See also
 Heathcote (surname)
 List of NCAA Division I Men's Final Four appearances by coach

References

 Autobiography: 

1927 births
2017 deaths
American men's basketball players
Basketball coaches from North Dakota
Basketball players from North Dakota
College men's basketball head coaches in the United States
High school basketball coaches in Washington (state)
Michigan State Spartans men's basketball coaches
Montana Grizzlies basketball coaches
National Collegiate Basketball Hall of Fame inductees
People from Kitsap County, Washington
People from Wells County, North Dakota
Washington State Cougars men's basketball coaches
Washington State Cougars men's basketball players
United States Navy personnel of World War II
United States Navy officers